The 2021 Saint Petersburg Challenger was a professional tennis tournament played on hard courts. It was the first edition of the tournament which was part of the 2021 ATP Challenger Tour. It took place in Saint Petersburg, Russia between 1 and 7 March 2021.

Singles main-draw entrants

Seeds

1 Rankings as of 22 February 2021.

Other entrants
The following players received wildcards into the singles main draw:
  Ivan Gakhov
  Dominic Stricker
  Evgenii Tiurnev

The following players received entry from the qualifying draw:
  Zizou Bergs
  Lucas Catarina
  Artem Dubrivnyy
  Andrey Kuznetsov

Champions

Singles

 Zizou Bergs def.  Altuğ Çelikbilek 6–4, 3–6, 6–4.

Doubles

 Christopher Eubanks /  Roberto Quiroz def.  Jesper de Jong /  Sem Verbeek 6–4, 6–3.

References

2021 ATP Challenger Tour
2021 in Russian tennis
March 2021 sports events in Russia